Vishwas Mandlik, better known as Mandlik sir, was the founder of the "Yoga Vidya Dham" and is considered one of the foremost yoga teachers in India. He has written many books on yoga practice and philosophy. On 6 March 2007, Paramhansa Niranjananda Saraswati of Bihar Yoga, initiated him to Rushi Sannayasa (part of higher  tradition) and gave new name Rushi Dharmajyoti.

Early years
Mandlik was born in 1944 in Nasik in a middle-class family. He completed his education from Nasik and then in Pune. In 1967, he graduated from University of Pune as Bachelor in Electrical engineering from Government College of Engineering, Pune, one of the oldest technical schools in India. During the college days, he won lot of awards on national level in competitive rowing and boating. He also won the prestigious "Senior Championship" in 1966.

Industrial career
Mandlik started his career as an Engineer in Voltas Transformers Ltd., a Multinational Company in Pune. After working there for 12 years eventually he started his own business of Manufacturing Electrical Distribution Transformers and Industrial Equipments in Nasik in 1978, expanding to Pune and Aurangabad in next few years. Along with his business, he was practicing yoga. He retired from his business in 1995, adopting Yoga Education as his life mission.

Career in Yoga
Mandlik started Yoga Vidya Dham in 1978, utilizing the morning and evening hours for the noble cause of Yoga Education. He has authored more than 45 books and over 200 audio cassettes and cds, 2 software on Yoga Education, applications of Yoga, Yoga as a Therapy, Yoga for Kids, Women etc. His books are mainly in Marathi and 
later translated in English, Hindi, Kenned, Gujarathi. He is the Editor of Yoga monthly called "Yoga Sugandha" for last 25 years. He is Vice Chancellor of Yoga Vidya Gurukul (Yoga University). He has treated more than 35000 patients suffering from various chronic diseases like Back ache, spondilitis, asthma, diabetes, heart problems, arthritis, hypertension, blood pressure, digestive disorders, psychosomatic disorders and many more through Yoga therapy centers in Nasik and other cities.  he conducts various courses, lectures, workshops on stress management, therapy etc. all over India. He has been the source of inspiration to thousands of yoga seekers, volunteers, teachers all over India and other countries as well.

He expanded the network of Yoga Vidya Dham to more than 200 cities in India and 16 cities outside India that includes Singapore, Thailand, Indonesia, Kazakhasthan  He presented more than 15 research papers in different International Yoga Conferences. He also worked as Member of different committees for below universities.
I) Kavikulaguru Kalidas Sanskrit University, Nagpur.
II) Yashvantrao Chavan Maharashtra Open University, Nashik.
III) North Maharashtra University, Jalagaon	
IV) Maharashtra University of Health Sciences, Nashik.

Yoga Vidya Dham
Yoga Vidya Dham is a university which imparts Yoga training to students and those aspiring to be yoga teachers. Yoga Vidya Dham is considered one of the big yoga institutes in India. Founded in 1978, it is working as a Non-Profit Organization having 150 branches in Maharashtra alone, 8 in Karnataka  and 7 in the eastern part of India. This includes all major cities of Maharashtra including Nasik, Pune, Ahmednager, Kolhapur, Pimpri-Chinchwad and others. It is now expanding in other countries such as United States, UK, Italy, Hong Kong, Australia and Ireland. More than 450,000 people have completed basic Yoga Pravesh course till today, with over 500 teachers. Yoga Vidya Dham runs 2 centers in Nasik. Various courses are conducted at different levels:
 Yoga Bindu
 Yoga Sopan
 Yoga Sanjivan
 Yoga Pravesh
 Yoga Parichay
 Yoga Praveen
 Yoga Pandit
 Yoga Teacher
 Yoga Adhyapak
 Yoga Pradhyapak

Awards

 Yogacharya by Paramacharya (Chancellor) of Bihar Yoga Bharati (First Yoga University in the World) Paramhansa Niranjananda Saraswati in 2003
 Recipient  of “Prime Minister’s Award for outstanding contribution towards promotion and development of YOGA” in 2018 
 Won the prestigious "Senior Championship" in 1965 in College of Engineering, Pune.
 Outstanding Citizen award  by Jaients Club Nashik in 1988
 Lifetime Achievement Award by K.L.Monot Amrutmahotsava Samiti. Pune in 1992
 Saraswati Award by Kailas Math Nasik in 1993
 Ideal Yoga Teacher by Rotary Club Nashik in 1996
 Yashvant Award by Shri Sadguru Trust Nashik in 2002
 Nashik Gourava by C _ News Nashik in 2003
 Yoga Ratna Award by Patanjali Yoga Kendra, Sangali in 2005
 Naturopathy Awaed by International Naturopathy Organization New Delhi in 2005
 Anubandhi award Shiva Parvati Trust Nashik in 2005
 Nashik Bhushan.by Rotary Club Nashik in 2005
 Loka Kalyan Award by Nashik Municipal Corporation in 2006
 Sanman Pater by Ghantali Mitra Mandal, Thane in 2006 
 Rushi DharmaJyoti By Paramahans Niranjananand Saraswati  in 2006
 Sanman Patra Nashik Dist. Yoga Association in 2006
 Yoga Gourava Award by L.Y.Patil Trust Hupari, Kolhapur in 2007
 Dadhichi Award by Education Society Ambarnath in 2007
 Awards on national level in competitive rowing, boating
 Prime Minister's National Yoga Award in 2018

Personal life
He is married to Pournima Mandlik who is also a practicing yoga teacher. He has a son named Gandhar Mandlik.

Work related to Yoga
 Yoga Vidya Dham organisation in 1972
 Yoga Chintan (A periodical magazine on Yoga.)
 Yoga Gurukul (University of Yoga) in Nasik, India.
 Yoga Chaitanya Seva Pratishthan - A trust to help propagation of Yoga in remote part of India.
 Yoga Chaitanya Sadhana Charitable Trust in 2009
 Yoga Mahavidyalaya, Nashik in 2013 (KKS University, Nagapur)

Major Achievements
 Expanded the network of Yoga Vidya Dham to more than 100 cities in India.
 Successfully treated more than 13000 patients suffering from various diseases in our Therapy centre.
 Presented more than 15 research papers in different International Yoga Conferences.
 Beneficiaries more than 2,51,700 in last 20 years.

Gallery

Books written

In English
 Yoga Bindu
 Yoga Pravesh
 Yoga Parichay
 Yoga Sopan Easy Way to Good Health / Yogic Solution for Back Pain
 Ashtang Yoga (Yoga the Science)

In Marathi 
 योग प्रवेश
 योग परिचय
 योग बिंदू
 योग सोपान
 निसर्गाची साद
 आरोग्यासाठी आहार 
 सूर्यनमस्कार 
 गुडघेदुखी
 विध्यार्थ्यांच्या सर्वांगीण विकासाची साधना
 अष्टांग योग, यमनियम
 मुक्तचिंतन भाग १ व २ 
 योगोपचार

CDs
 मुलांसाठी योगनिद्रा
 तणावमुक्तीसाठी योगनिद्रा
 विकारमुक्तीसाठी योगनिद्रा

References

1944 births
Indian yoga teachers
Living people